This is the list of châteaux, which are located in Franche-Comté.

Doubs 
Château des Archevêques, in Etalans
Château de Belvoir, in Belvoir
Citadelle de Besançon, in Besançon
Château de Bournel, in Cubry
Château de Chalamont, in Villers-sous-Chalamont
Château de Charencey, in Chenecey-Buillon
Château de Château de Châteauvieux, in Châteauvieux-les-Fossés
Château de Châtel Derrière and Château des ducs de Wurtemberg, in Montbéliard
Château de Cléron, in Cléron
Château de Corcondray, in Corcondray
Château de Durnes, in Durnes
Château de Fertans, in Fertans
Château de Fourg, in Fourg
Château de Franois, in Franois
Château de Goux les Usiers, in Goux-les-Usiers
Château de Joux, in Joux
Château de Montby, in Gondenans-Montby
Château du Désert, in Maîche
Château de Mérode, in Maîche
Château de Montalembert, in Maîche
Château de l'Hermitage, in Mancenans-Lizerne
Château de Montfaucon, in Montfaucon
Château de Montferrand, in Montferrand-le-Château
Château de Montjoie, in Montjoie-le-Château
Château de Montrond, in Montrond-le-Château
Château de d'Ornans, in Ornans
Château de Puy de Montenot, in Arc-sous-Montenot
Château de La Roche, in Rigney
Château de Roche-sur-Loue, in Arc-et-Senans
Château de Rochejean, in Rochejean
Château de Roulans, in Roulans
Château de Saint-Denis, in Chassagne-Saint-Denis
Château de Sainte-Anne, in Sainte-Anne
Château de Sombacour, in Sombacour
Château de Thoraise, in Thoraise
Château de Vaire-Le-Grand, in Vaire-Arcier
Château de Vuillafans, in Vuillafans

Haute-Saône 
Château de Borey, in Borey
Château d'Étobon, in Étobon
Château de Filain, in Filain
Château des Grammont, in Villersexel
Château de Granges-le-Bourg, in Granges-le-Bourg
Château de Héricourt, in Héricourt
Château d'Oricourt, in Oricourt 
Château de Ray-sur-Saône, in Ray-sur-Saône
Château de Vallerois-le-Bois, in Vallerois-le-Bois

Jura 
Château d'Andelot, in Andelot-Morval
Château d'Arlay, in Arlay
Château de Baume, in Saint-Lothain
Château de Chevreaux, in Chevreaux
Château de Cornod, in Cornod
Château de Domblans, in Domblans
Château de Dramelay, in Dramelay
Château de Frontenay, in Frontenay
Château Gréa, in Rotalier
Château de Mérona, in Mérona
Château de Mirebel, in Mirebel
Château de Mutigney in Mutigney
Château de la Muyre, in Domblans
Château d'Oliferne, in Vescles
Château d'Ougney, in Ougney
Château de Présilly, in Présilly
Château de Pymont, in Villeneuve-sous-Pymont
Château de Syam, in Champagnole

Territoire de Belfort 
 Château de Belfort, in Belfort
 Château du Rosemont, in Riervescemont
 Château de Rougemont, in Rougemont-le-Château

See also
 List of castles in France